Colubraria tumida is a species of sea snail, a marine gastropod mollusk in the family Colubrariidae.

Description

Distribution

References

External links

Colubrariidae
Gastropods described in 2000